The Arizona Diamondbacks are a Major League Baseball franchise based in Phoenix, Arizona. The Diamondbacks compete in the National League West division. Officially known as the "First-Year Player Draft", the Rule 4 Draft is Major League Baseball's primary mechanism for assigning amateur baseball players from high schools, colleges, and other amateur baseball clubs to its teams. The draft order is determined based on the previous season's standings, with the team possessing the worst record receiving the first pick. In addition, teams which lost free agents in the previous off-season may be awarded compensatory or supplementary picks. Since the franchise first participated in the draft in 1996, the Diamondbacks have selected 28 players in the first round. The First-Year Player Draft is unrelated to the 1997 expansion draft in which the Diamondbacks filled their roster.

Of the 28 players picked in the first round by the Diamondbacks, 15 have been pitchers, the most of any position; 11 of these have been right-handed, while 4 have been left-handed.  Five players taken in the first round have been shortstops; additionally, two players have been selected at each of first base, third base, catcher, and the outfield. No second baseman has been selected in the first round by the Diamondbacks.  The Diamondbacks have drafted 16 players out of college, and 10 out of high school. Arizona has drafted seven players out of high schools or colleges in the state of California, with two being taken from each of Florida, Georgia, and their home state of Arizona.

The Diamondbacks' 2003 selection—Carlos Quentin, who was then playing with the Chicago White Sox—won the 2008 Silver Slugger Award as one of the three best offensive outfielders in the American League.  The franchise has held the first-overall pick once, in 2005, when they selected Justin Upton. The Diamondbacks have received twelve compensatory picks, including nine selections made in the supplemental round of the draft since the franchise's first draft in 1996. These additional picks are provided when a team loses a particularly valuable free agent in the previous off-season, or, more recently, if a team fails to sign a draft pick from the previous year.

Key

Picks

See also
Arizona Diamondbacks minor league players

Footnotes
 Through the 2012 draft, free agents were evaluated by the Elias Sports Bureau and rated "Type A", "Type B", or not compensation-eligible. If a team offered arbitration to a player but that player refused and subsequently signed with another team, the original team was able to receive additional draft picks. If a "Type A" free agent left in this way, his previous team received a supplemental pick and a compensatory pick from the team with which he signed. If a "Type B" free agent left in this way, his previous team received only a supplemental pick. Since the 2013 draft, free agents are no longer classified by type; instead, compensatory picks are only awarded if the team offered its free agent a contract worth at least the average of the 125 current richest MLB contracts. However, if the free agent's last team acquired the player in a trade during the last year of his contract, it is ineligible to receive compensatory picks for that player.
 The Diamondbacks lost their first-round pick in 1998 to the Kansas City Royals as compensation for signing free agent Jay Bell.
 The Diamondbacks gained a supplemental first-round pick in 1999 for losing free agent Devon White.
 The Diamondbacks lost their first-round pick in 2000 to the Atlanta Braves as compensation for signing free agent Russ Springer.
 The Diamondbacks gained a compensatory first-round pick in 2003 from the Seattle Mariners for losing free agent Greg Colbrunn.
 The Diamondbacks gained a supplemental first-round pick in 2005 for losing free agent Richie Sexson.
 The Diamondbacks gained a supplemental first-round pick in 2006 for losing free agent Tim Worrell.
 The Diamondbacks gained a supplemental first-round pick in 2007 for losing free agent Craig Counsell.
 The Diamondbacks gained a supplemental first-round pick in 2007 for losing free agent Miguel Batista.
 The Diamondbacks gained a supplemental first-round pick in 2008 for losing free agent Liván Hernández.
 The Diamondbacks gained a compensatory first-round pick in 2009 from the Los Angeles Dodgers for losing free agent Orlando Hudson.
 The Diamondbacks gained a supplemental first-round pick in 2009 for losing free agent Orlando Hudson.
 The Diamondbacks gained a supplemental first-round pick in 2009 for losing free agent Juan Cruz.
 The Diamondbacks gained a supplemental first-round pick in 2009 for losing free agent Brandon Lyon.
 The Diamondbacks gained a compensatory first-round pick in 2011 for failing to sign 2010 first-round pick Barret Loux.

References
General references

In-text citations

First-round draft picks
Arizona Diamondbacks first-round draft picks